KCRT-FM (92.5 FM, "The Mountain") is a radio station broadcasting a classic rock music format. Licensed to Trinidad, Colorado, United States, the station is currently owned by Phillips Broadcasting, Inc.

As of September 28, 2020, KCRT-FM has added translator K294BO, broadcasting from Monte Vista, CO on 106.7 MHz.  The FCC web site has not been updated to reflect this change as of September 28, 2020.

References

External links

CRT-FM
Classic rock radio stations in the United States
Radio stations established in 1977